Preet Se Bandhi Ye Dori Ram Milaayi Jodi is an Indian Television drama Series that aired on Zee TV. It premiered on 20 September 2010 and ended on 12 April 2012.

Plot 
The story is that of a Sikh Punjabi girl named Mona meeting her dream boy Anukalp, who belongs to a Gujarati family. It shows their marriage which has a chance of working only if their families stop fighting.

The story expresses contrasting emotions of pain and pleasure in the uniting of two culturally dissimilar families – each intensely defensive and uncompromising about its cultural uniqueness.

Cast

 Priyal Gor/Sara Khan as Mona Gandhi: Vimmi and Satnaam's daughter; Anukalp's widow; Aditya's wife
 Nishant Singh Malkani/Sujay Reu as Anukalp Gandhi: Bharti and Kalpesh's son; Aditya and Hetal's brother; Mona's former husband
 Angad Hasija as Aditya Gandhi: Bharti and Kalpesh's son; Anukalp and Hetal's brother; Mona's husband
 Krutika Desai Khan as Bharti Gandhi: Ketaki's sister; Kalpesh's wife; Anukalp, Aditya and Hetal's mother
 Ketki Dave as Ketaki Rane: Bharti's sister; Anukalp, Aditya and Hetal's aunt
 Sanjeev Jogtiyani as Kalpesh Gandhi: Lata's son; Bijal's brother; Bharti's husband; Anukalp, Aditya and Hetal's father
 Madhuri Sanjeev as Lata Gandhi: Kalpesh and Bijal's mother; Anukalp, Aditya and Hetal's grandma
 Nimisha Vakharia as Bijal Gandhi: Lata's daughter; Kalpesh's sister; Anukalp, Aditya and Hetal's aunt
 Riva Bubber as Vimmi Bedi: Satnaam's wife; Mona's mother
 Indraneel Bhattacharya as Satnaam Singh Bedi: Gurnaam's brother; Vimmi's husband; Mona's father
 Preet Kaur Madhan as Sweety Sodhi: Amrit and Gurnaam's daughter; Karan's sister; Mona's cousin; Parmeet's wife
 Vishal Nayak as Parmeet Sodhi: Goldie's brother; Sweety's husband
 Neeraj Malviya as Karan Bedi: Amrit and Gurnaam's son; Sweety's brother; Mona's cousin; Hetal's husband
 Meher Vij as Hetal Bedi: Bharti and Kalpesh's daughter; Anukalp and Aditya's sister; Karan's wife
 Chitrapama Banerjee as Amrit Bedi: Gurnaam's wife; Sweety and Karan's mother; Mona's aunt
 Sunil Sinha as Gurnaam Singh Bedi: Satnaam's brother; Amrit's husband; Sweety and Karan's father; Mona's uncle
 Manit Joura as Goldie Sodhi: Parmeet's brother
 Damini Joshi as Aanchal Mehat: Anukalp's one sided lover

Guests
 Himesh Reshammiya as himself

References

Zee TV original programming
Indian drama television series
2010 Indian television series debuts
2012 Indian television series endings